

The Rotax 462 is a , two-cylinder, two-stroke aircraft engine, derived from a snowmobile engine. It was built by Rotax of Austria for use in ultralight aircraft.

Applications
Guerpont Autoplum
Huntwing 462LC
Platzer Motte
Sky-Walker 1+1

Specifications (462)

See also

References

Notes

Bibliography

External links
https://www.rotax-owner.com/pdf/HISTORICAL_RepairManual(1994)462-532-582UL.pdf

Air-cooled aircraft piston engines
Rotax engines
Two-stroke aircraft piston engines